Bluestem can refer to various grasses:
 Little bluestem (Schizachyrium scoparium)
 Big bluestem (Andropogon gerardii) and other species of the genus Andropogon
 Species in the genus Dichanthium
 Cane bluestem and Caucasian bluestem of the genus Bothriochloa